St Michael's Chapel is the former Anglican chapel to Lancaster Moor Hospital, to the east of Lancaster, Lancashire, England.  It was built in 1866 to a design by the local architect E. G. Paley.  Its architectural style is Neo-Norman.  The chapel is constructed in sandstone with ashlar dressings and a slate roof.  Its plan is cruciform, consisting of a nave with a west porch, north and south transepts, and a chancel with an apsidal east end.  The windows are round-headed with voussoirs of alternating red and yellow sandstone. Both transepts contain a rose window above two single-light windows.  Since becoming redundant the chapel has been converted into flats.  The former chapel is recorded in the National Heritage List for England as a designated Grade II listed building.

See also

Listed buildings in Lancaster, Lancashire
List of ecclesiastical works by E. G. Paley

References

Lancaster Moor Hospital
Romanesque Revival church buildings in England
Churches completed in 1866
19th-century Church of England church buildings
Church buildings by E. G. Paley
Former Church of England church buildings
Churches in Lancaster, Lancashire
1866 establishments in England